Football is the most popular sport in Djibouti. The country became a member of FIFA in 1994, but has only taken part in the qualifying rounds for the African Cup of Nations as well as the FIFA World Cup in the mid-2000s. In November 2007, the Djibouti national football team beat Somalia's national squad 1-0 in the qualification rounds for the 2010 FIFA World Cup, marking its first World Cup-related win.

League system

Djibouti stadiums

See also
Djiboutian Football Federation
Djibouti Premier League
Djibouti national football team
Djibouti Cup
Stade du Ville

References